Anton Hangel (born 28 May 1904, date of death unknown) was an Austrian weightlifter. He competed at the 1928 Summer Olympics and the 1936 Summer Olympics.

References

1904 births
Year of death missing
Austrian male weightlifters
Olympic weightlifters of Austria
Weightlifters at the 1928 Summer Olympics
Weightlifters at the 1936 Summer Olympics
Place of birth missing
20th-century Austrian people